Tech in Asia is a Singapore- and Jakarta-based technology news website covering topics on startups and innovation in Asia. It has hosted annual conferences across the continent primarily in Singapore, Tokyo, and Jakarta since 2012. It was backed by Facebook co-founder Eduardo Saverin in 2015.

History and growth 
Tech in Asia was founded in 2010 by Willis Wee during his third year of university.

The website maintains a focus on Asian and southeast Asian countries, often covering startups and legislative developments from Singapore, Indonesia, Vietnam, Thailand, Malaysia, China, and India.

In October 2018, Tech in Asia launched its subscription program where it moved from offering free articles previously to a paywall-like structure. In its initial iteration, the single-tier paid subscription offered users access to five free articles per month, after which they were asked to pay US$18 a month or US$180 a year. Currently, the portal offers three subscription plans, ranging from free to US$16.58 per month. All of its plans are billed yearly, with the uppermost tier now costing US$199 per year. A mid-level subscription, priced at US$59 per year, offers limited access to the portal's "Premium" coverage.

In November 2017, Tech in Asia raised US $6.6 million in funding led by Hanwha Investment and Securities.

In 2018, Tech In Asia launched Studios, a marketing agency providing integrated media, marketing, events, and design solutions for brands.

Tech in Asia maintains a standalone Tech in Asia Indonesia website which exclusively publishes Indonesian-language content. The websites are staffed by different teams, each creating their own content and maintaining separate production schedules.

References

External links

Internet properties established in 2010
2010 establishments in Singapore
Mass media companies established in 2010
Singaporean companies established in 2010
Singaporean websites